Leone Ginzburg (4 April 1909 – 5 February 1944) was an Italian editor, writer, journalist and teacher, as well as an important anti-fascist political activist and a hero of the resistance movement. He was the husband of the renowned author Natalia Ginzburg and the father of the historian Carlo Ginzburg.

Early life and career
Ginzburg was born in Odessa to a Jewish family.  World War I began while the family was on vacation in Viareggio, Italy, and while his older brother and sister (then 15 and 18) traveled with their mother back to Russia, Leone remained, with his governess, for the duration of the war.  He was reunited with his family when his mother and siblings fled to Italy following the October Revolution in Russia.

He studied at the Liceo Ginnasio Massimo d'Azeglio in Turin. This school molded a group of intellectuals and political activists who would fight Benito Mussolini's Fascist regime and, eventually, help create the post-war democratic Italy. His classmates included such notable intellectuals as Norberto Bobbio, Piero Gobetti, Cesare Pavese, Giulio Einaudi, Massimo Mila, Vittorio Foa, Giancarlo Pajetta and Felice Balbo. During his time in Turin he contributed to Il Baretti, a literary magazine launched by Piero Gobetti in 1924.

In the early 1930s, Ginzburg taught Slavic Languages and Russian Literature at the University of Turin, and was credited with helping to introduce Russian authors to the Italian public. In 1933, Ginzburg co-founded, with Giulio Einaudi, the publishing house Einaudi. He lost his teaching position in 1934, having refused to swear an oath of allegiance imposed by the Fascist regime.

Persecution and internal exile 

Soon after this, he and 14 other young Turinese Jews, including Sion Segre Amar, were arrested for complicity in the so-called "Ponte Tresa Affair" (they were carrying anti-fascist literature over the border from Switzerland), but Ginzburg's sentence was light. He was arrested again in 1935 for his activities as leader (with Carlo Levi) of the Italian branch of Giustizia e Libertà, the Justice and Freedom Party, which Carlo Rosselli had founded in Paris in 1929.

In 1938, he married Natalia Ginzburg (née Levi). The same year he lost his Italian citizenship when the Fascist regime introduced antisemitic racial laws. In 1940, the Ginzburgs received the fascist punishment known as confino, or internal exile, to a remote, impoverished village, in their case Pizzoli in the Abruzzi, where they stayed from 1940-1943.

Somehow, Leone was able to continue his work as head of the Einaudi publishing house throughout the period. In 1942, he co-founded the clandestine Partito d'Azione or "Action Party", a party of the democratic resistance. He also edited their newspaper L'Italia Libera.

Capture and murder 
In 1943, after the Allied invasion of Sicily and the fall of Mussolini, Leone went to Rome, leaving his family in the Abruzzi. When Nazi Germany invaded in September, Natalia Ginzburg and their three children fled Pizzoli, simply climbing aboard a German truck and telling the driver that they were war refugees who had lost their papers. They met with Leone and went into hiding in the capital.

On 20 November 1943, Leone – who now used the false name Leonida Gianturco – was arrested by the Italian police in a clandestine printshop of the newspaper L'Italia Libera. He was taken to the German section of the Regina Coeli prison. They subjected him to severe torture. On 5 February 1944 he died there from the injuries he received; he was 34 years old.

Works
 Scrittori russi (1948)
 Scritti (1964)

References

Further reading 
 Natalia Ginzburg, All Our Yesterdays
 Natalia Ginzburg, The Things We Used To Say
 Susan Zuccotti, The Italians and the Holocaust: Persecution, Rescue, and Survival, University of Nebraska Press

External links 
 Books of the Times; Richard Bernstein, "Telling the Bigger Story With the Small Details", The New York Times, August 4, 1999

1909 births
1944 deaths
Odesa Jews
People from Kherson Governorate
Italian male journalists
Italian anti-fascists
Members of Giustizia e Libertà
Resistance members killed by Nazi Germany
Jewish anti-fascists
Jewish Italian politicians
Jews from the Russian Empire
Action Party (Italy) politicians
20th-century Italian politicians
People executed by torture
Jewish resistance members during the Holocaust
Jews executed by Nazi Germany
Italian people executed by Nazi Germany
Emigrants from the Russian Empire to Italy
Emigrants from the Russian Empire to Germany
20th-century Italian journalists
Writers from Turin
20th-century Italian Jews
20th-century Italian male writers
Jewish Italian writers